Peter Sydney Ernest Lawford ( Aylen; 7 September 1923 – 24 December 1984) was an English-American actor.

He was a member of the "Rat Pack" and the brother-in-law of US president John F. Kennedy and senators Robert F. Kennedy and Edward Kennedy. From the 1940s to the 1960s, he was a well-known celebrity and starred in a number of highly acclaimed films. In later years, he was noted more for his off-screen activities as a celebrity than for his acting; it was said that he was "famous for being famous".

Early life
Born in London in 1923, he was the only child of Lieutenant General Sir Sydney Turing Barlow Lawford, KBE (1865–1953) and May Sommerville Bunny (1883–1972). At the time of Peter's birth, however, his mother was married to Lieutenant Colonel Dr. Ernest Vaughn Aylen D.S.O, one of Sir Sydney's officers, while his father was married to Muriel Williams. At the time, May and Ernest Aylen were living apart. May confessed to Aylen that the child was not his, a revelation that resulted in a double divorce. Sydney and May wed in September 1924 after their divorces were finalised and when their son was one year old.

Lawford's family was connected to the English aristocracy through his uncle Ernest Lawford's wife (a daughter of the Scottish 14th Earl of Eglinton) as well as his aunt Ethel Turner Lawford (who married a son of the 1st Baron Avebury). His aunt, Jessie Bruce Lawford, another of his father's sisters, was the second wife of the Hon Hartley Williams, senior puisne judge of the Supreme Court of the colony of Victoria, Australia. A relative, through his mother, was Australian artist Rupert Bunny.

Early childhood
He spent his early childhood in France and, owing to his family's travels, was never formally educated. Instead, he was schooled by governesses and tutors, and his education included tennis and ballet lessons.

"In the beginning," his mother observed, "he had no homework. When he was older he had Spanish, German and music added to his studies. He read only selected books: English fairy stories, English and French classics; no crime stories. Having studied Peter for so long, I decided he was quite unfitted for any career except art, so I cut Latin, Algebra, high mathematics and substituted dramatics instead."

Because of the widely varying national and religious backgrounds of his tutors, Lawford "attended various services in churches, cathedrals, synagogues and for some time was an usher in a Christian Science Sunday School...."

Around 1930, aged seven, he made his acting debut in the English film Poor Old Bill. He also had an uncredited bit in A Gentleman of Paris (1931).

Accident
At the age of 14, Lawford severely injured his right arm in an accident when it went through a glass door. Irreversible nerve damage severely compromised the use of his forearm and hand, which he later learned to conceal. The injury resulted in his being unable to follow a military career as his parents had hoped. Instead, Lawford pursued a career as an actor, a decision that resulted in one of his aunts refusing to leave him her considerable fortune, as she had originally planned.

Career

Early career

In 1938, Lawford was travelling through Hollywood when spotted by a talent scout. He was screen tested and made his Hollywood debut in a minor part in the film Lord Jeff starring Freddie Bartholomew.

The outbreak of World War II found the Lawfords in Florida. In a matter of days, they realised that they had been stranded. Their money was in Britain and Britain was at war. Their assets were frozen. Peter, then 16, took a job parking cars. When he saved enough money for the fare, he went back to Hollywood where he supported himself working as a theatre usher until he began to get film work.

Extra work and bit parts
The advent of World War II saw an increase in British war stories and Lawford found himself in demand playing military personnel, albeit usually in uncredited parts. He could be glimpsed in Mrs. Miniver (1942) and Eagle Squadron (1942), both times as pilots.

His first decent role in a major film production was in A Yank at Eton (1942), starring Mickey Rooney, in which Lawford played a snobbish bully. It was very popular at the box office.

Lawford was a cadet in Thunder Birds: Soldiers of the Air (1942) and Junior Army (1942) (starring Bartholomew), a soldier in Random Harvest (1942), Immortal Sergeant (1942), and London Blackout Murders (1943) (directed by George Sherman), and a navigator in Assignment in Brittany (1943). He had a billed part in The Purple V (1943).

At MGM he was a student in Above Suspicion (1943), a soldier in Pilot #5 (1943), a naval commander in The Sky's the Limit (1943) (with Fred Astaire), and an Australian in The Man from Down Under (1943). He had a minor role at Republic's Someone to Remember (1943) and The West Side Kid (1943), the latter directed by Sherman.

Lawford played a soldier in Sahara (1943) and sailors in Sherlock Holmes Faces Death (1943) and Corvette K-225 (1943). He was a Frenchman in Paris After Dark (1943) and Flesh and Fantasy (1943), and was a student in MGM's Girl Crazy (1943) and The Adventures of Mark Twain (1944).

MGM
Lawford's career stepped up a notch when signed to a long-term contract to MGM in June 1943. The studio signed him with a specific role in mind - The White Cliffs of Dover (1944), in which he played a young soldier during the Second World War. 

Lawford had a small role in The Canterville Ghost (1944) and Mrs. Parkington (1944), playing a suitor of Greer Garson.

MGM gave him another important role in The Picture of Dorian Gray (1945).

Leading man

Lawford's first leading role came in Son of Lassie (1945), a big hit.

Lawford was put in a Kathryn Grayson-June Allyson musical, Two Sisters from Boston  (1946) which was very popular. Ernst Lubitsch used him at Fox in Cluny Brown (1946) where he was billed after Charles Boyer and Jennifer Jones.

He won a Modern Screen magazine readers' poll as the most popular actor in Hollywood of 1946. His fan mail jumped to thousands of letters a week. With actors such as Clark Gable and James Stewart away at war, Lawford was recognised as a new romantic lead on the MGM lot.

Lawford made My Brother Talks to Horses (1947) with Jackie Butch Jenkins, an early work of Fred Zinnemann which was a big flop. He was reunited with Grayson in It Happened in Brooklyn  (1947), which also starred Frank Sinatra. Lawford received rave reviews for his work in the film, while Sinatra's were lukewarm.

Lawford later admitted that the most terrifying experience of his career was the first musical number he performed in the musical Good News (1947), the film he starred in alongside Allyson. Using an American accent for his role, he won acclaim as a performer.

He was Esther Williams' leading man in On an Island with You (1948) and supported Fred Astaire and Judy Garland in Easter Parade (1948), a huge hit, and Greer Garson and Walter Pidgeon in Julia Misbehaves (1948), also popular.

He played Laurie in MGM's version of Little Women (1949) alongside Allyson and Elizabeth Taylor. He was billed beneath Pidgeon and Ethel Barrymore in the anti-Communist The Red Danube (1949) and was one of Deborah Kerr's leading men in Please Believe Me (1950).

He was Jane Powell's love interest in Royal Wedding (1951) with Fred Astaire and co-starred with Janet Leigh in Just This Once (1952), both popular.

20th Century Fox borrowed him for Kangaroo (1952), a melodrama shot in Australia with Maureen O'Hara.

Back at MGM he was top billed in some lower budgeted films: You for Me (1953), a comedy, The Hour of 13 (1953), a thriller and Rogue's March (1953), a war film. The studio then let him go.

 
Lawford's first film after Metro released him and several other players from their contracts was the comedy It Should Happen to You (1954), wherein he starred alongside Judy Holliday and Jack Lemmon.

Television
He focused on television, guest starring on shows like General Electric Theater, Schlitz Playhouse, and The Ford Television Theatre.

In 1954, Lawford married Patricia Kennedy, sister of Senator John F. Kennedy. Lawford would become an enthusiastic fundraiser for the Senator.

Lawford had a regular role on a TV sitcom, Dear Phoebe (1954–55) but the show only ran 32 episodes.

When it ended he resumed guest starring on shows like Alfred Hitchcock Presents, Jane Wyman Presents The Fireside Theatre, Screen Directors Playhouse , Schlitz Playhouse again, Playhouse 90, Producers' Showcase (a version of Ruggles of Red Gap), several episodes of Studio 57, Climax! and Goodyear Theatre.

Lawford had another starring role on a TV series, The Thin Man (1957–59) with Phyllis Kirk, an NBC series from MGM based on the novel by Dashiell Hammett. It was more successful running for 72 episodes.

Frank Sinatra and the Rat Pack

In 1959, Sinatra invited Lawford to join the "Rat Pack" and also got him a role in Never So Few (1959).

Peter Lawford and Sinatra appeared in Oceans 11 (1960). Lawford had been first told of the basic story of the film by director Gilbert Kay, who heard the idea from a gas station attendant. Lawford eventually bought the rights in 1958, imagining William Holden in the lead. Sinatra became interested in the idea, and a variety of writers worked on the project.

Lawford played a British soldier in the acclaimed Israeli-set drama Exodus (1960) for Otto Preminger and had a cameo in Pepe (1960). In 1960, he became a U.S. citizen and assisted on his brother-in-law's successful presidential election.

He did a TV remake of The Farmer's Daughter (1962) with Lee Remick and was reunited with the Rat Pack in Sergeants 3 (1962).

Lawford played a Senator in Advise & Consent (1962) for Preminger and was Lord Lovat in  The Longest Day (1962), a war film with a star-studded cast.

Producer
In 1961, Lawford and his manager Milt Ebbins formed Chrislaw Productions, which was named after Peter's son Christopher. It signed a three-year deal with United Artists to make three features and two TV series for $10 million. William Asher was to be executive producer. Their first project was to be a remake of the old silent film The Great Train Robbery. That film was not made; however they did produce the 1963 action film Johnny Cool starring Henry Silva and Elizabeth Montgomery.

Lawford was Bette Davis's leading man in Dead Ringer (1964) and guest starred on The Alfred Hitchcock Hour, Profiles in Courage (as General Alexander William Doniphan), Bob Hope Presents the Chrysler Theatre and Run for Your Life.

He went on to produce the Patty Duke film Billie (1965) and had supporting roles in two Carroll Baker movies, playing her fiancé both times: Sylvia (1965) and Harlow (1965).

By now, Lawford had fallen out with Sinatra — who replaced him in Robin and the 7 Hoods (1964) with Bing Crosby — but Davis remained loyal and got Lawford a supporting role in A Man Called Adam (1966). He played a washed-up film star in The Oscar  (1966).  He and Patricia Kennedy divorced in 1966.

He guest-starred on shows like The Wild Wild West, I Spy and was in How I Spent My Summer Vacation (1967).

Lawford went to Europe to star in Dead Run (1967) and The Fourth Wall (1968). He was a popular guest star on TV comedy and game shows.

He produced a film starring himself and Davis, Salt and Pepper (1968), and had support roles in Skidoo (1968) for Preminger, Buona Sera, Mrs. Campbell (1968), Hook, Line & Sinker (1969) with Jerry Lewis, and The April Fools (1969).

Salt and Pepper was popular enough for Lawford to raise money for a sequel, One More Time (1970) directed by Lewis. He supported George Hamilton in Togetherness (1970) and guest starred several times on Rowan & Martin's Laugh-In. In 1971, he would marry Rowan's daughter Mary.

Later career
Lawford's later films included A Step Out of Line (1971), Clay Pigeon (1971), and The Deadly Hunt (1971). He had the lead role in Ellery Queen: Don't Look Behind You and guest starred on Bewitched. In 1971 he appeared as Ben Hunter on The Men From Shiloh (rebranded name for The Virginian) in the episode titled "The Town Killer." He had a semi recurring role in The Doris Day Show (1971–72) and even directed an episode.

He returned to MGM for They Only Kill Their Masters (1972), which reunited him with several former MGM contract players.

Lawford was in The Phantom of Hollywood (1974), the pilot for Born Free, Rosebud (1975) for Preminger, Won Ton Ton: The Dog Who Saved Hollywood (1976), Hawaii Five-O, Fantasy Island, The Love Boat , Angels' Brigade (1979), Highcliffe Manor, Supertrain, Mysterious Island of Beautiful Women (1979), Gypsy Angels (1980), Body and Soul (1981), and episodes of The Jeffersons.

His last role was as Montague Chippendale in Where Is Parsifal? (1983).

Personal life

His first marriage, in 1954, was to socialite Patricia Kennedy, a younger sister of John F. Kennedy, then a Democratic U.S. senator from Massachusetts. They had four children: a son, actor and author Christopher Lawford (1955−2018), and daughters Sydney Maleia Lawford (b. 1956), Victoria Francis Lawford (b. 1958), and Robin Elizabeth Lawford (b. 1961).

Lawford became a U.S. citizen on 23 April 1960. He had prepared for this in time to vote for his brother-in-law in the upcoming presidential election. Lawford, along with other members of the "Rat Pack", helped campaign for Kennedy and the Democratic Party. Sinatra famously dubbed him "Brother-in-Lawford" at this time. Lawford and Patricia Kennedy divorced in February 1966.

Lawford was originally cast as Alan A. Dale in the film Robin and the 7 Hoods but was replaced by Bing Crosby following a break in Frank Sinatra's relationship with Lawford. The break stemmed from a scheduled visit to Sinatra's home by Lawford's brother-in-law, President Kennedy, during a 1962 West Coast trip. Attorney General Robert F. Kennedy, who had long been concerned about Sinatra's rumoured ties with underworld figures, encouraged the president to change his plans and stay at Crosby's home, which (it was maintained) could provide better security for the president. The change came at the last minute, after Sinatra had made extensive arrangements for the promised and eagerly awaited presidential visit, including the construction of a helipad, which he later destroyed in a fit of rage. Sinatra was furious, believing that Lawford had failed to intercede with the Kennedys on his behalf, and banished him from the Rat Pack.

Sinatra and Lawford's friendship was over. They only spoke when Sinatra called after his son Frank Sinatra Jr. was kidnapped on 8 December 1963, and he needed the help of Lawford's brother-in-law Robert F. Kennedy, then attorney general. With the exception of Pat Brown in his unsuccessful re-election as governor of California in 1966 and Vice President Hubert H. Humphrey's run for the presidency in the 1968 United States presidential election, Sinatra never endorsed another Democratic candidate. Crosby, a staunch Republican, was cast in Lawford's role.

Lawford married his second wife, Mary Rowan, daughter of comedian Dan Rowan, in October 1971. Rowan and Lawford separated two years later and divorced in January 1975. In June 1976 he married aspiring actress Deborah Gould, whom he had known for three weeks. Lawford and Gould separated two months after marrying and divorced in 1977. Following the divorce, Lawford moved into the Sierra Towers where he lived for the next few years on the 30th floor. During his separation from Gould, Lawford met Patricia Seaton who became his fourth and final wife in July 1984, just months before his death.

Death
Lawford died at Cedars-Sinai Medical Center in Los Angeles on Christmas Eve 1984, aged 61, from cardiac arrest. He had suffered from kidney and liver failure after years of substance abuse. His body was cremated, and his ashes were interred at Westwood Village Memorial Park Cemetery. Owing to a dispute between his widow and the cemetery, Lawford's ashes were removed from the cemetery in 1988 and scattered into the Pacific Ocean off the coast of California by his widow Patricia Seaton Lawford, who invited the National Enquirer tabloid to photograph the event.

For his contribution to the television industry, Peter Lawford has a star on the Hollywood Walk of Fame located at 6920 Hollywood Boulevard.

A plaque bearing Lawford's name was erected at Westwood Village Memorial Park.

Filmography

Radio appearances

See also

 Kennedy family tree

References

Footnotes

Sources

External links

 
 
 
 

1923 births
1984 deaths
20th-century English male actors
American male film actors
American male television actors
British film producers
California Democrats
English expatriates in the United States
English emigrants to the United States
English male film actors
English male television actors
Deaths from kidney failure
Deaths from liver failure
Kennedy family
Metro-Goldwyn-Mayer contract players
People with acquired American citizenship
Rat Pack